Wilkesia hobdyi, the dwarf iliau, is a species of flowering plant in the family Asteraceae that is endemic to the island of Kauai in Hawaii. It was first collected in 1968, and was not formally described until 1971. The number of living plants is estimated at fewer than 300. It is considered Critically Imperiled in global rank which means it is at very high risk of extinction.  It has been a federally protected species since 1992. The genus Wilkesia is one of three genera constituting the silversword alliance, a group of highly diverse yet genetically exceedingly closely related species, all thought to be descended from a colonizing ancestor related to the tarweed of North America.

Description
Wilkesia hobdyi is a perennial shrub with branches reaching a length of  extending vertically from the base. Cream-colored flowers are produced in inflorescences  in diameter. Flowering has been observed most often in the winter months, but
also during June. This species is probably pollinated through outcrossing and is probably self-incompatible. Insects are the most likely pollinators. Wilkesia die after flowering.

Habitat
Rainfall in these sites is less than 1,200 ml per year.

Threats
The primary threat to the species is grazing by feral goats. Native species evolved in the absence of grazing animals and thus did not develop any mechanism for protection. When goats were introduced in the 18th century, many native species were devastated.  The existing plants are found only on nearly vertical cliffs which even goats cannot climb. The species is also threatened by encroachment by alien plant species, especially grasses which can smother the plants. Alien grasses also pose fire hazards which endanger the plants. The other species making up the Wilkesia genus, W. gymnoxiphium, is not officially endangered, though it is also found only on Kaua'i and is not common there.

Associated plants
Associated plants include āhinahina (Artemisia spp.) iliau (Wilkesia gymnoxiphium), nehe (Lipochaeta connata), Lobelia niihauensis, makou (Peucedanum sandwicense), kokio ula (Hibiscus kokio), alahee (Psydrax odorata), alaala wai nui (Peperomia spp.), naio (Myoporum sandwicense), ilima (Sida fallax), uhaloa (Waltheria indica), aalii (Dodonaea viscosa), and kāwelu (Eragrostis variabilis).

References

Madieae
Endemic flora of Hawaii
Biota of Kauai
Plants described in 1971